Atal Bihari Vajpayee Institute of Medical Sciences and Dr. Ram Manohar Lohia Hospital, formerly Post Graduate Institute of Medical Education and Research (PGIMER), New Delhi is a higher Medical training and research institute at Dr. Ram Manohar Lohia Hospital, New Delhi. It is affiliated to Guru Gobind Singh Indraprastha University, New Delhi.

It was established in 2009 as Post Graduation and Super-Specialty Research and Training Institute.

In 2019, It started MBBS course with 100 seats.

History

The inauguration of the college was done by the Honourable Health Minister of India Dr. Harshwardhan on 16 August 2019 on the 1st death anniversary of former Prime Minister and Bharat Ratna Shree Atal Bihari Vajpayee. The first batch of MBBS students joined the college in August 2019.

The Institute has senior faculties transferred from VMMC & Safdarjung hospital for non-clinical subjects followed by other teaching faculty from Dr. RML hospital.
The current infrastructure will be enhanced further with a dedicated building for academics of undergraduates, 16-storey Hostel building for PGs and resident doctors.

Affiliations

The Institute is affiliated to Guru Gobind Singh Indraprastha University (GGSIPU), New Delhi under the Govt. of NCT Delhi.

Infrastructure

The college runs in the PGIMER, New Delhi building attached to the Dr. RML hospital campus. It has state-of-the-art lecture theatres, dissection hall, physiology, biochemistry, microbiology labs and a state-of-the-art library. 

A new dedicated MBBS building is sanctioned. Currently, construction is delayed due to Covid-19 pandemic.

Annual Fest

ABVIMS and Dr. RML Hospital hosts an annual fest called Revels. However, Revels 2020 was cancelled due to Covid-19 pandemic.

Research and Publications

https://www.researchgate.net/plugins/institution?stats=true&faces=true&publications=true&height=600&width=300&theme=light&type=institution&installationId=5f265626ad72a26fc15c5edf

References 

Medical colleges in Delhi
Colleges of the Guru Gobind Singh Indraprastha University
Memorials to Ram Manohar Lohia